The 10th National Assembly of Pakistan was the legislature of Pakistan following the 1993 general election of members of parliament (MPs) or Member of the National Assembly of Pakistan (MNA) to the National Assembly of Pakistan, the lower house of the bicameral Majlis-e-Shura.  The National Assembly of Pakistan is a democratically elected body currently made up of 342 members, known as Members of the National Assembly (MNAs), of which 272 are elected directly, however the political parties are allotted 70 reserved seats for women and religious minorities in accordance with their share of the vote.

For 10th National Assembly, Pakistan held general elections to choose the members of the National Assembly on October 6, 1993. Elections were held following the resignations of President Ghulam Ishaq Khan and Prime Minister Nawaz Sharif in order to end a power conflict. Moeenuddin Ahmad Qureshi's caretaker administration oversaw the elections. The Pakistan Peoples Party (PPP) won the most seats despite receiving more votes than the Pakistan Muslim League (N) (PML (N)). Benazir Bhutto was elected to a second non-consecutive term as prime minister after gaining the support of small parties and independents and voter turnout was 40%.

After formation of government, the 10th National Assembly of Pakistan was elected Syed Yousaf Raza Gillani for the Speaker of National Assembly of Pakistan from 17 October 1993 to 6 February 1997. On October 19, 1993, Mohtarma Benizar Bhutto took the oath of office as Pakistan's prime minister and on November 5, 1996, President Farooq Ahmad Khan Laghari dissolved the assembly on charges of economic mismanagement, corruption, failure on the law-and-order.

Members 
Note: The election constituencies from the general election of 1993 are listed below, they do not link to the most recent election constituencies because they have been completely altered.

Minorities indirectly elected 
The 10th National Assembly of Pakistan's minority members who were chosen indirectly are listed below.

Membership changes

See also 

 List of members of the 1st National Assembly of Pakistan
 List of members of the 2nd National Assembly of Pakistan
 List of members of the 3rd National Assembly of Pakistan
 List of members of the 4th National Assembly of Pakistan
 List of members of the 5th National Assembly of Pakistan
 List of members of the 6th National Assembly of Pakistan
 List of members of the 7th National Assembly of Pakistan
 List of members of the 8th National Assembly of Pakistan
 List of members of the 9th National Assembly of Pakistan
 List of members of the 10th National Assembly of Pakistan
 List of members of the 11th National Assembly of Pakistan
 List of members of the 12th National Assembly of Pakistan
 List of members of the 13th National Assembly of Pakistan
 List of members of the 14th National Assembly of Pakistan
 List of members of the 15th National Assembly of Pakistan

Notes

References 

1993 Pakistani general election
Lists of members of the National Assembly of Pakistan by term
Pakistani MNAs 1993–1996